MV2 may refer to:

 Pindad MV2, a light military vehicle
 Vis viva, an early description of kinetic energy using the formula

See also
 2MV, early Soviet unmanned probes to Mars and Venus